Radha Lakshmi Vilasam "RLV" College of Music and Fine Arts is an academic institution situated in Thripunithura, Kochi in the state of Kerala, India. It is affiliated to the Mahatma Gandhi University and offers graduate and postgraduate courses in music, performing arts and visual arts. The current principal is  Prof. C.J Suseela

History 
The college began in a single apartment belonging to the Cochin Royal family.

The then King of  Cochin, Kerala Varma Midukkan Thampuran and his wife Smt. Lakshmikutty Nethyaramma invited experts in stitching, kaikottikkali, and painting to impart learning to girls and elder ladies. This endeavor developed into an institution in the name of the King’s daughter Radha and wife Lakshmi and was named ‘Radha Lakshmi Vilasam Academy’ incorporating vocal music also.

In 1956, the institution was brought under the control of the government of Kerala and was renamed as RLV Academy of Music and Fine Arts. Diploma and Post Diploma Courses in vocal music, Bharathanatyam, Kathakali, and painting were started.

In 1998, the institution was affiliated to the Mahatma Gandhi University, Kerala at Kottayam. The Diploma and Post Diploma Courses were restructured as degree and postgraduate courses.

Faculties and departments

Faculty of Music 
 Department of Vocal
 Department of Veena
 Department of Violin
 Department of Mridangam

Faculty of Performing Arts 
 Department of Bharatanatyam
 Department of Mohiniyattam
 Department of Kathakali Vesham
 Department of Kathakali Sangeetham
 Department of Chenda
 Department of Maddalam

Faculty of Visual Arts 
 Department of Painting
 Department of Sculpture
 Department of Applied Arts

Courses 
Bachelor of Arts - Music and Performing Arts
Master of Arts - Music and Performing Arts
Bachelor of Fine Arts - Visual Arts
Master of Fine Arts - Visual Arts

Notable alumni 
 K.J. Yesudas
 Thiruvizha Jayashankar
 Thonnakkal Peethambaran
 Mayyanad Kesavan Namboodiri
 Benoy Varghese
 Vaikom Valliammal
 Vaikom Vasudevan Namboothiri
 Haripad KPN Pillai
 Seema G. Nair
 Gowry Lekshmi
 Sabareesh Prabhaker
 RLV Ramakrishnan
 Minmini

Principals 
N.V.Narayana  Bhagavathar 1956-57
K.S.Kumaraswamy Iyer 1957-66
K.S.Harihara Iyer 1966-68
Nellai T.V.Krishnamoorthy 1969-70
Parassala B.Ponnammal 1970-80
Mavelikkara R.Prabhakara Varma 1981-84
Smt. S. Janaki 1984-85
T.P.Moni Iyer1985-86
K.K.Dharmarajan 1986-88
P. Leela 1988-94
V.I.Suku 1994-96
Avaneeswaram Ramachandran 1996-98
Tripunithura K.Lalitha 2000-02
P.S.Vanajam 2002-2009
R.Kamakshi 2009-12
Prof M.Balasubramoniam  (2012- 2014)
 Dr K.S.Jays ( 2014-2015 )
 Prof T.N.Govindan Namboothiri ( 2015 -
 Prof. Chalakkudy V.K.Ramesan

References

Arts and Science colleges in Kerala
Colleges affiliated to the University of Kerala
Music schools in India
Universities and colleges in Kochi
1997 establishments in Kerala
Music schools in Kerala